Roque del Oeste (Spanish for "rock of the west"), also referred to as Roque del Infierno, is an uninhabited islet located 0.6 km northeast of the island of Montaña Clara, in the northeasternmost part of the Canary Islands, the Chinijo Archipelago. The highest point of the island is 41 m above sea level. The island is part of the nature reserve Los Islotes, which is part of the natural park Chinijo Archipelago.

See also 

 List of islands of Spain

References 

Islands of the Canary Islands
Uninhabited islands of Spain